Hawker Britton is a lobbying and political consulting firm, headquartered in Australia. It is known to have influence with the Australian Labor Party.

It has the largest number of clients on the Australian Government Federal Lobbyist Register, and has multiple offices spread across Australia and New Zealand.

It is majority owned by WPP AUNZ, a marketing conglomerate headquartered in Australia, New Zealand, and South East Asia; itself a subsidiary of the WPP plc conglomerate.

Corporate History
Hawker Britton was established in 1997 by Bruce Hawker and David Britton. Before starting the company, Bruce Hawker was Chief of Staff to New South Wales Premier Bob Carr, and Britton was Carr's senior media advisor.

The firm has provided political campaign consultancy services across many elections.

The founders have left the company. David Britton left in 2005 to work for the Fred Hollows Foundation. Bruce Hawker left in December 2010 to set up a new campaign-focused venture.

Contemporary management 
The current Managing Director is Justin Di Lollo, a former staffer to Labor leader Kim Beazley. Di Lollo also heads the STW Group government relations function.

Simon Banks is the company's Federal Director. Banks worked for three Federal Labor Leaders, including Kevin Rudd. He managed Labor's successful 2007 Federal election strategy. The Power Index ranked Banks the third most influential among all lobbyists in Canberra in November 2011.

The firm's website shows it employs many former Labor Party staffers, MPs and campaign professionals.

Clients 
In South Australia, Hawker Britton has represented the following clients: AARNet, Adelaide Airport Limited, AMP, APA Group, Australian Science Innovations, Bunnings, CHC, Engie, Expedia, Fantastic Holdings, Free TV, Heathgate Resources, Hewlett Packard Enterprise, Liberty House Group, Lion, Lockheed Martin, Mayne Pharma, McDonald's, Medibank, Motorola, Officeworks, QBE, Quasar Resources, Red Bull, Science meets Parliament SA, SMS Management & Technology, Serco, Taxi Council SA and Yellow Edge.

References

External links
 Official website

Lobbying firms in Australia
Communications and media organisations based in Australia
Consulting firms established in 1997